1BR is a 2019 American horror film written and directed by David Marmor, in his directorial debut. The title is an abbreviation of "one bedroom", commonly seen in real estate listings. The film premiered at Fantasia International Film Festival in July 2019, and was released in the United States in 2020.

Plot
An aspiring costume designer moves into a one-bedroom apartment in Los Angeles, unaware that the complex is owned by a cult who use torture to force new residents to join their community.

Cast

Production 
During the early stages of production, the film's offices were victim of the Skirball Fire in 2017, and were forced to use producer Alok Mishra's home in the San Fernando Valley as the base of operations during filming. The outside exteriors of the apartments were used on-location in Los Angeles, with the indoor scenes being shot on a soundstage.

Release 
The film premiered at Fantasia International Film Festival on July 18, 2019. The film had a limited theatrical and VOD release on April 24, 2020, before beginning to stream on Netflix on August 28.

Over its first week of release on Netflix the film was among the top 5 most-streamed films, reaching #1 in the film section of the site.

Reception 
The website's critics consensus reads: "1BRs occasionally ordinary storytelling is more than outweighed by tight direction, interesting ideas, and an effective blend of horror and thoughtful drama." On Metacritic, the film has a weighted average score of 56 out of 100 based on 8 critic reviews, indicating "mixed or average reviews".

John DeFore of The Hollywood Reporter wrote: "Taken on its own terms, it's a solid if hardly revolutionary thriller that bodes well for the filmmaker's future in genre films."

References

External links 
 

2019 films
2019 horror films
American horror thriller films
2010s English-language films
Films set in apartment buildings
Films set in Los Angeles
Films shot in Los Angeles
2010s American films